Plumeria obtusa, the Singapore graveyard flower, is a species of the genus Plumeria (Apocynaceae). It is native to the West Indies (including the Bahamas and the Greater Antilles), southern Mexico, Belize, Guatemala, and Florida. but widely cultivated for its ornamental and fragrant flowers around the world, where suitably warm climate exists. It is reportedly naturalized in China.

Taxonomy
Plumeria obtusa was described as a new species in 1753 by Carl Linnaeus. Its specific epithet "obtusa" means "blunt", in reference to its blunt-tipped leaves.

Description
Infrequently, individuals can grow to be . Its flowers are white with yellow throats and each has five petals. The fragrant flowers bloom in clusters. They are obovate, or teardrop-shaped.

Distribution
Plumeria obtusa is native to the Greater Antilles, Florida, northern Central America and southern Mexico. Cultivation is common in warmer parts of the world, including Southeast Asia and coastal parts of the Arabian Peninsula.

Common names
 châmpéi slük tiel  - Khmer
 gulcampā - Dhivehi

Uses
This plant is commonly used as an ornamental, grown for its flowers. In Cambodia the flowers are used to make necklaces and in offerings to the deities. In traditional medicine used in that country, a decoction of the bark is given in varying doses as a purgative or as a remedy against oedema.

References

obtusa
Flora of Florida
Trees of the Caribbean
Trees of Belize
Trees of Guatemala
Trees of the Yucatán Peninsula
Plants described in 1753
Taxa named by Carl Linnaeus